NVA is a three-letter acronym for:

Benito Salas Airport, with IATA code NVA
National People's Army, or Nationale Volksarmee, the military of former German Democratic Republic
NVA (film), a German film from 2005 about the NVA
National Volleyball Association, a men's professional volleyball league in America
New Flemish Alliance, a Flemish political party
No value added, management term
Nonivamide, an organic compound
Normandy Veterans' Association, an association of Allied ex-servicemen who served in the 1944 Normandy invasion
North Vietnamese army, also known as the People's Army of Vietnam
NVA (arts organisation), based in Glasgow, Scotland